Polyphlebium is a fern genus in the family Hymenophyllaceae. The genus is accepted in the Pteridophyte Phylogeny Group classification of 2016 (PPG I) but not by some other sources.

Taxonomy
The genus Polyphlebium was erected by Edwin Copeland in 1938. Its status, like other genera in the family Hymenophyllaceae, remains disputed. The Pteridophyte Phylogeny Group classification of 2016 (PPG I) accepts the genus, saying that there are about 15 species. , the Checklist of Ferns and Lycophytes of the World lists 17 species, whereas Plants of the World Online sinks the genus into Trichomanes.

Phylogeny
, the Checklist of Ferns and Lycophytes of the World accepted the following species:
Phylogeny of Polyphlebium by Fern Tree of Life.
 

Unassigned species:
Polyphlebium borbonicum (Bosch) Ebihara & Dubuisson
Polyphlebium haughtii (Morton) comb. ined.
Polyphlebium herzogii (Rosenst.) A.R.Sm. & M.Kessler
Polyphlebium philippianum (Sturm) Ebihara & Dubuisson
Polyphlebium pyxidiferum (L.) Ebihara & Dubuisson
Polyphlebium tenuissimum (Bosch) comb. ined.
Polyphlebium werneri (Rosenst.) Ebihara & K.Iwats.

See also 
 List of fern families

References 

Hymenophyllales
Fern genera